Anne Fontaine is a filmmaker and actress.

Anne Fontaine may also refer to:

Anne Fontaine (designer), fashion designer
Anne Fontaine (brand), fashion brand
Anne Fontaine Foundation, nonprofit organisation